Futuramas fifth season is composed of the TV edits of the four direct-to-video films, split into four episodes each. While the films were originally released between November 27, 2007 and February 24, 2009, the TV edits began airing on March 23, 2008 and concluded after 16 episodes on August 30, 2009. These episodes were the first produced for Comedy Central, after their negotiations with Fox for syndication rights gave the opportunity to create new episodes.

Production
Futurama was initially canceled by Fox, in 2003, due to low ratings. However, in late 2002, Cartoon Network acquired exclusive cable syndication rights to Futurama for a reported $10 million. In January 2003, the network began airing Futurama episodes as the centerpiece to the expansion of their Adult Swim cartoon block. In October 2005, Comedy Central picked up the cable syndication rights to air Futuramas 72-episode run at the start of 2008, following the expiration of Cartoon Network's contract. It was cited as the largest and most expensive acquisition in the network's history. In 2005, it began airing every night, followed by South Park. A Comedy Central teaser trailer announced the return of Futurama on March 23, 2008, which was Bender's Big Score divided into four episodes followed by the other three movies. The series also airs in syndication in many countries around the world.

When Comedy Central began negotiating for the rights to air Futurama reruns, Fox suggested that there was a possibility of also creating new episodes. Negotiations were already underway with the possibility of creating two or three straight-to-DVD films. When Comedy Central committed to sixteen new episodes, it was decided that four films would be produced. On April 26, 2006, Groening noted in an interview that co-creator David X. Cohen and numerous writers from the original series would be returning to work on the movies. All the original voice actors participated. In February 2007, Groening explained the format of the new stories: "[The crew is] writing them as movies and then we're going to chop them up, reconfigure them, write new material and try to make them work as separate episodes."

The first movie, Futurama: Bender's Big Score, was written by Ken Keeler and Cohen, and includes return appearances by the Nibblonians, Seymour, Barbados Slim, Robot Santa, the "God" space entity, Al Gore, and Zapp Brannigan. It was animated in widescreen and was released on standard DVD on November 27, 2007, with a possible Blu-ray Disc release to follow. A release on HD DVD was rumored but later officially denied. Futurama: Bender's Big Score was the first DVD release for which 20th Century Fox implemented measures intended to reduce the total carbon footprint of the production, manufacturing, and distribution processes. Where it was not possible to completely eliminate carbon output, carbon offsets were used. They refer to the changed processes as "carbon neutral".

The second movie, The Beast with a Billion Backs, was released on June 24, 2008. The third movie, Bender's Game was released on DVD and Blu-ray Disc on November 3, 2008 in the UK, November 4, 2008 in the USA, and December 10, 2008 in Australia. The fourth movie, Into the Wild Green Yonder, was released on DVD and Blu-ray Disc on February 23, 2009.

Since no new Futurama projects were originally in production at the time, the movie Into the Wild Green Yonder was designed to stand as the Futurama series finale. However, Groening had expressed a desire to continue the franchise in some form, including as a theatrical film. In an interview with CNN, Groening said that "we have a great relationship with Comedy Central and we would love to do more episodes for them, but I don't know... We're having discussions and there is some enthusiasm but I can't tell if it's just me."

On June 9, 2009, 20th Century Fox announced that Comedy Central had picked up the show for 26 new half-hour episodes that began airing in mid-2010. A smaller writing crew returned.

Episodes

Reception
IGN had mostly positive reviews on the four DVD movie releases of the season.

Home releases

References

Futurama lists
2008 American television seasons
2009 American television seasons
 
Futurama seasons